Duncan River may refer to:

Canada
Duncan River (British Columbia)
Duncan River (rivière le Renne tributary), in Acton Regional County Municipality, Montérégie, Quebec

New Zealand
Duncan River (New Zealand), in the West Coast region of the South Island

See also

 Duncan Creek (disambiguation)

 Duncan (disambiguation)
 River (disambiguation)